Elections for the post of first President of India were to be held on 24 January 1950. There was only one nominee for the post, Rajendra Prasad and he was elected, unopposed, as the President.

Details
The Constituent Assembly of India met for the last time on 24 January 1950, two days before the Constitution came into effect on the 26th. On that day, they declared that the song Jana Gana Mana was the National Anthem of India, signed a Hindi copy of the constitution and voted in a new President. Prasad had been the president of the Constituent Assembly from December 1946. He was proposed to be the first Indian president by Jawaharlal Nehru and was seconded by Vallabhbhai Patel. There were no other nominations and hence the secretary of the assembly, H. V. R. Iengar declared that Rajendra Prasad was considered to be duly elected to the office of President of India.

He was sworn in on the first Republic Day, 26 January 1950, by the Governor-General of India, C. Rajagopalachari, in the presence of the Chief Justice of India, Harilal Jekisundas Kania. Prasad's sister, Bhagwati Devi, had died the previous day, 25 January. He attended her cremation after the founding and swearing-in ceremony.

See also
1952 Indian presidential election

References

1950 in India
Presidential elections in India
Uncontested elections
1950 elections in India